This is a descriptive list of the various trade tariffs and customs duties which apply in Pakistan.

Import duty
Custom duties are levied according to the rates given in the First Schedule, which includes:

 Goods imported to Pakistan
 Goods purchased in bond from one custom station to another
 Goods brought from a foreign country to any customs station that are trans-shipped or transported without the payment of duty to another customs station.

Export duty
Pakistan does not levy an export duty.

Regulatory duty
The Federal Government can impose limitations or restrictions on regulatory duty on all or any of the imported or exported goods through a notification in the official Gazette. Such limitations or restrictions, according to the First Schedule, should not exceed 100% of the goods value, as specified under Section 25-1B or Section 25-A. Such regulations are applicable from the day they are specified in the Gazette notification.

Additional customs duty
The Federal Government can impose additional customs duty on imported goods specified in the First Schedule through a notification in the official Gazette. The additional customs duty should not exceed 35% of the goods value, as specified under Section 25-2A or Section 25A-2b.

References 

 

Law of Pakistan
Foreign trade of Pakistan
Tariffs
Tariffs